"We Used to Be Friends" is a song by American alternative rock band The Dandy Warhols. It was released as the lead single from their fourth studio album Welcome to the Monkey House on 23 April 2003.

The single did not chart in the US but peaked at number 18 in the UK.

Content 

The song bears a similar intro riff, chord progression and vocal melody to that of a Feeder song "Day In Day Out", and the band have listed Grant Nicholas as co-writer to avoid lawsuit.

Reception 

NME praised the track, describing it as "a synthetic chatter of robotic handclaps and tweaky guitar fuzz, creamed off with a squeaky-clean chorus delivered in alarming falsetto".

Cultural references 

The song is known for being the theme song to the TV series Veronica Mars, and was also notably featured in episodes of The O.C. and Wonderfalls, as well as the FIFA Football 2004 soundtrack. It was also the theme song to Australian reality series My Restaurant Rules, and was featured as background music in the LucasArts video game Thrillville: Off the Rails.

In 2011, Chris Carrabba of Dashboard Confessional covered the song on his album Covered in the Flood. Alejandro Escovedo recorded a new acoustic version for the soundtrack of the 2014 film adaptation Veronica Mars.  Chrissie Hynde covered the song for season 4 of Veronica Mars.

Track listing

7" vinyl
 "We Used to Be Friends"
 "Minnesoter (Thee Slayer Hippie Mix)"

DVD
 "We Used to Be Friends" (video)
 "Bohemian Like You (Boston Dave Mix)"
 "Minnesoter (Thee Slayer Hippie Mix)"
 An Introduction to The Dandy Warhols

Charts

References

External links
 
 

Songs about friendship
2003 singles
2003 songs
Children's television theme songs
The Dandy Warhols songs
Songs written by Courtney Taylor-Taylor
Song recordings produced by Bjorn Thorsrud
Songs written by Grant Nicholas